The renal cortex is the outer portion of the kidney between the renal capsule and the renal medulla. In the adult, it forms a continuous smooth outer zone with a number of projections (cortical columns) that extend down between the pyramids. It contains the renal corpuscles and the renal tubules except for parts of the loop of Henle which descend into the renal medulla. It also contains blood vessels and cortical collecting ducts.

The renal cortex is the part of the kidney where ultrafiltration occurs. Erythropoietin is produced in the renal cortex.

Additional images

References

Kidney anatomy